Hemistomia gemma is a species of minute freshwater snails with an operculum, aquatic gastropod molluscs or micromolluscs in the family Hydrobiidae. This species is endemic to Australia.

References

External links

Gastropods of Australia
Hemistomia
Gastropods described in 1982
Taxonomy articles created by Polbot